The Turkish worm lizard (Blanus strauchi) is a species of amphisbaenian in the family Blanidae. The species is native to Southeast Europe and the Middle East. There are two recognized subspecies.

Etymology
The specific name, strauchi, is in honor of Russian herpetologist Alexander Strauch.

Geographic range
B. strauchi is found in Greece, Iraq, Syria, and Turkey.

Habitat

Reproduction
B. strauchi is oviparous.

Subspecies
Two subspecies are recognized as being valid, including the nominotypical subspecies.
Blanus strauchi bedriagae 
Blanus strauchi strauchi 

Nota bene: A trinomial authority in parentheses indicates that the subspecies was originally described in a genus other than Blanus.

References

Further reading
Bedriaga J (1884). "Amphisbaena cinerea Vand. und A. Strauchi v. Bedr., Erster Beitrag zur Kenntniss der Doppelschleichen ". Archiv für Naturgeschichte 50 (1): 23–41. (Amphisbaena strauchi, new species, pp. 35–41, Figures 4–6). (in German).
Bedriaga J (1884). "Nachträgliche Bemerkung über Amphisbaena Strauchi v. Bedr." Zoologischer Anzeiger 7: 346. (in German).
Boulenger GA (1884). "Descriptions of new Species of Reptiles in the British Museum.—Part II." Annals and Magazine of Natural History, Fifth Series 13: 396–398. (Blanus bedriagae, new species, p. 396).
Sindaco R, Jeremčenko VK (2008). The Reptiles of the Western Palearctic. 1. Annotated Checklist and Distributional Atlas of the Turtles, Crocodiles, Amphisbaenians and Lizards of Europe, North Africa, Middle East and Central Asia. (Monographs of the Societas Herpetologica Italica). Latina, Italy: Edizioni Belvedere. 580 pp. .

Blanus
Taxa named by Jacques von Bedriaga
Reptiles described in 1884